Bolshoy Dubovsky is a rural locality (a khutor) in Deminskoye Rural Settlement, Novoanninsky District, Volgograd Oblast, Russia. The population was 53 as of 2010.

Geography 
Bolshoy Dubovsky is located in forest steppe on the Khopyorsko-Buzulukskaya Plain, on the Panika River, 31 km northwest of Novoanninsky (the district's administrative centre) by road. Popovsky is the nearest rural locality.

References 

Rural localities in Novoanninsky District